The North European Basketball League, or Northern European Basketball League (NEBL), was a short-lived regional professional basketball league. It was founded in 1998, by Šarūnas Marčiulionis and Dmitry Buriak. The league was the first commercial project of a regional league in Europe, and initially intended for participation of the best basketball teams from five countries - Lithuania, Latvia, Estonia, Sweden, and Finland.

History
In 1999, the first North European Basketball League competition took place, involving eight teams, from the aforementioned countries. Eventually, the tournament started to lose its regional characteristics, as it began involving more clubs from Central (Germany, Poland, Czech Republic), Western (Belgium, the Netherlands), and Eastern (Russia, Ukraine, Belarus, Bulgaria, Romania) Europe; then, from Southern Europe (Macedonia, FR Yugoslavia), and even from Israel and Turkey. There were 31 teams, from 19 countries (from Israel to the United Kingdom), participating in the 2001–02 season's tournament. The Final Four of the NEBL, was always played in Vilnius, Lithuania.

By 2002, top clubs like CSKA Moscow, Žalgiris, and Maccabi, had lost their interest in the competition, in favor of the newly organized, and much more commercially attractive, EuroLeague. In the season 2002–03 season, a body (group stage) of the tournament was not held – the four best teams of the Northern Conference FIBA Champions Cup played for the last NEBL title in a Final Four.

The NEBL would later be transformed (since 2004) into Baltic Basketball League (BBL), with basketball teams from Lithuania, Latvia, and Estonia participating in it.

Seasons

See also
 European North Basketball League

External links
 NEBL slogan: Break the ice! 20 April 2000 The Baltic Times.

 
Defunct multi-national basketball leagues in Europe
1998 establishments in Europe
2003 disestablishments in Europe
Sports leagues established in 1998
Sports leagues disestablished in 2003
Basketball leagues in Lithuania
Basketball leagues in Latvia
Basketball leagues in Estonia
Basketball leagues in Belarus
Basketball leagues in Ukraine
Basketball leagues in Russia
Sport in the Baltic states